The Kalapani territory is an area under Indian administration as part of Pithoragarh district in the Kumaon Division of the Uttarakhand state, but it is also claimed by Nepal since 1997. According to Nepal's claim, it lies in Darchula district, Sudurpashchim Province.
The territory represents part of the basin of the Kalapani river, one of the headwaters of the Kali River in the Himalayas at an altitude of 3600–5200 meters. The valley of Kalapani, with the Lipulekh Pass at the top, forms the Indian route to Kailash–Manasarovar, an ancient pilgrimage site. It is also the traditional trading route to Tibet for the Bhotiyas of Kumaon and the Tinkar valley of Nepal.

The Kali River forms the boundary between India and Nepal in this region. However, India states that the headwaters of the river are not included in the boundary. Here the border runs along the watershed. This is a position dating back to British India .

Nepal has another pass, the Tinkar Pass (or "Tinkar Lipu"), close to the area. After India closed the Lipulekh Pass in the aftermath of the 1962 Sino-Indian War, much of the Bhotiya trade used to pass through the Tinkar Pass. The Nepalese protests regarding the Kalapani territory started in 1997, after India and China agreed to reopen the Lipulekh pass.
Since that time, Nepalese maps have shown the area up to the Kalapani river, measuring 35 square kilometres, as part of Nepal's Darchula District.

A joint technical committee of Indian and Nepalese officials have been discussing the issue since 1998, along with other border issues. But the matter has not yet been resolved.

On 20 May 2020, Nepal released a new map of its own territory that expanded its claim an additional 335 square kilometres up to the Kuthi Yankti river, including Kalapani, Lipulekh and Limpiyadhura. It did not explain why a new claim arose. According to The Kathmandu Post, residents of Kalapani, Lipulekh and Limpiyadhura, which India has claimed for decades, were not counted after the 1961 Nepal census.

Geography and tradition 
According to the Almora District Gazetteer (1911) "Kalapani" (literally, "dark water") is the name given to a remarkable collection of springs near the Kalapani village. The stream, bearing the name "Kalapani River", is formed from two streams, says the Gazetteer, one rising from the western end of the Lipulekh Pass (Lipu Gad) and another from the western declivity of the Kuntas peak (Tera Gad). Modern maps show two further streams joining from the southeast, which arise at the Om Parvat and Point 6172 respectively. The latter of these, called Pankha Gad, joins the river very near the Kalapani village.

The Gazetteer continues to state that the united stream of Kalapani flows five miles southwest, where it is joined by the Kuthi Yankti river that arises from the Limpiyadhura Pass (near the village of Gunji). After this union, the river is called the "Kali River". Language being not entirely logical, the term "Kali River" is often applied to the river from the location of the springs themselves. The springs are considered sacred by the people of the area and "erroneously" regarded as the origin of the Kali River. However, they had been regarded as a landmark by the British from the very first survey undertaken by W. J. Webb in 1816.

The area on both sides of the Kali River is called Byans, which was a pargana (district in Mughal times). It is populated by  Byansis, who speak a West Himalayish language (closely related to the Zhang-Zhung language once spoken in West Tibet). The Byansis practise transhumance, living in their traditional homes in the high Himalayas during the summer and moving down to  towns such as Dharchula in the winter. While high-altitude pastoralism is the mainstay of the Byansis, trade with western Tibet was also a key part of their livelihood. Both the Limpiyadhura pass and the Lipulekh pass were frequently used by the Byansis, but the Lipulekh pass leading to the Tibetan trading town of Burang (or Taklakot) was the most popular.

To the southeast of the Kalapani river is the Tinkar valley (presently in Nepal), with large villages of Changru and Tinkar. This area is also populated by Byansis. They have another pass referred to as Tinkar Pass that leads to Burang.

History

Early 19th century 

Following the Unification of Nepal under Prithvi Narayan Shah, Nepal attempted to enlarge its domains, conquering much of Sikkim in the east and, in the west, the basins of Gandaki and Karnali and the Uttarakhand regions of Garhwal and Kumaon. This brought them in conflict with the British, who controlled directly or indirectly the north Indian plains between Delhi and Calcutta. A series of campaigns termed the Anglo-Nepalese War occurred in 1814–1816. In 1815 the British general Ochterlony evicted the Nepalese from Garhwal and Kumaon across the Kali River, ending the 25-year rule of the region by Nepal.

Octherlony offered peace terms to the Nepalese demanding British oversight through a Resident and the delimitation of Nepal's territories corresponding roughly to its present-day boundaries in the east and west. The Nepalese refusal to accede to these terms led to another campaign the following year, targeting the Kathmandu Valley, after which the Nepalese capitulated.

The resulting agreement, the Sugauli Treaty, states in its Article 5:

Even though the Article was meant to set Kali River as the boundary of Nepal, initially the British administrators retained control of the entire Byans region both to the east and west of the Kali/Kalapani river, stating that it had been traditionally part of Kumaon. In 1817, the Nepalese made a representation to the British, claiming that they were entitled to the areas to the east of Kali. After consideration, the British governor-general in council accepted the demand. The Byans region to the east of Kali was transferred to Nepal, dividing the Byans pargana across the two countries.

Not being satisfied with this, the Nepalese also extended a claim to the Kuthi valley further west, stating that the Kuthi Yankti stream, the western branch of the head waters, should be considered the main Kali River. Surveyor W. J. Webb and other British officials showed that the lesser stream flowing from the Kalapani springs "had always been recognised as the main branch of the Kali" and "had in fact given its name to the river". Consequently, the British Indian government retained the Kuthi valley.

Late 19th century 

Some time around 1865, the British shifted the border near Kalapani to the watershed of the Kalapani river instead of the river itself, thereby claiming the area now called the Kalapani territory. This is consistent with the British position that the Kali River begins only from the Kalapani springs, which meant that the agreement of Sugauli did not apply to the region above the springs. Scholars Manandhar and Koirala believe that the shifting of the border was motivated by strategic reasons. The inclusion of the highest point in the region, Point 6172, provides an unhindered view of the Tibetan plateau. For Manandhar and Koirala, this represents an "unauthorized", "unilateral" move on the part of the British. However Nepal was effectively a British-protected state at that time, even though the British termed it an "independent state with special treaty relations". Around the same time that the British claimed the Kalapani territory, they had also ceded to Nepalese control the western Tarai regions. Nepal's boundaries had moved on from those of the Sugauli treaty.

20th century 

In 1923, Nepal received recognition from the British as a completely independent state. In 1947, India acquired independence from their rule and became a republic. Nepal and India entered into a Treaty of Peace and Friendship in 1950, which had a strong element of mutual security alliance, mirroring the earlier treaties with British India.

No changes in India's border with Nepal are discernible from the maps of the period. The Kalapani territory continued to be shown as part of India. Following the Chinese take-over of Tibet in 1951, India increased its security presence along the northern border to inhibit possibilities of encroachment and infiltration. The Kalapani area is likely to have been included among such areas. Nepal too requested India's help in policing its northern border as early as 1950, and 17 posts are said to have been established jointly by the two countries.

Nepal expert Sam Cowan states that, from the date of its independence, India "has assumed and acted on the basis that the trail to Lipu Lekh fell exclusively within its territory". The 1954 Trade Agreement between India and China mentioned Lipulekh as one of the passes that could be used by Indo-Tibetan trade and pilgrimage traffic. Nepal was not mentioned in the Agreement. A State Police post was established at Kalapani in 1956, which remained in place till 1979, when it was replaced by Indo-Tibetan Border Police.

The China–Nepal boundary agreement signed on 5 October 1961 states:

So the trijunction of the India–China–Nepal borders was at the meeting point of the watersheds of Karnali, Kali and Tinkar rivers, which lies just to the west of Tinkar Pass. Tinkar Pass is where the Border Pillar number 1 of the China–Nepal border was placed, and still remains.

After the 1962 border war with China, India closed the Lipulekh Pass. The Byansis of Kumaon then used the Tinkar Pass for all their trade with Tibet. In 1991, India and China agreed to reopen the Lipulekh pass, and the trade through it steadily increased.

Kalapani dispute (1998–2019) 
Nepal virtually ignored the Kalapani issue — the 35 km2 of area between the Lipu Gad/Kalapani River and the watershed of the river — from 1961 to 1997; since then, says scholar Leo E. Rose, it became "convenient" of Nepal to raise the controversy for domestic political reasons. In September 1998, Nepal agreed with India that all border disputes, including Kalapani, would be resolved through bilateral talks. However, despite several rounds of negotiations from 1998 to the present, the issue remains unresolved.

Nepal has laid claim to all the areas east of the Lipu Gad/Kalapani River, their contention being that the Lipu Gad was in fact the Kali River up to its source. They wanted the western border shifted 5.5 km westwards so as to include the Lipulekh Pass. Indian officials responded that the administrative records dating back to 1830s show that the Kalapani area had been administered as part of the Pithoragarh district (then a part of the Almora district). India also denied the Nepalese contention that Lipu Gad was the Kali River. In the Indian view, the Kali River begins only after Lipu Gad is joined by other streams arising from the Kalapani springs. Therefore, the Indian border leaves the midstream of river near Kalapani and follows the high watershed of the streams that join it.

In May 2020, India inaugurated a new link road to the Kailas-Manasarovar. Nepal objected to the exercise and said that it was violative of the prior understanding that boundary issues would be resolved through negotiation. India reaffirmed its commitment to negotiation but stated that the road follows the pre-existing route.

Lympiadhura claims 
The CPN-ML faction led by Bam Dev Gautam, which split off from CPN-UML in 1998, laid more expansive claims than the Nepalese government. Several Nepalese intellectuals drove these claims, chief among them being Buddhi Narayan Shrestha, the former Director General of the Land Survey Department. According to the intellectuals, the "Kali River" is in fact the Kuthi Yankti river that arises below the Limpiyadhura range. So they claim the entire area of Kumaon up to the Kuthi Valley, close to 400 km2 in total. Up to 2000, the Nepalese government did not subscribe to these expansive demands. In a statement to the Indian Parliament in 2000, the Indian foreign minister Jaswant Singh suggested that Nepal had questioned the source of the Kalapani river. But he denied that there was any dispute regarding the matter.

On 20 May 2020, Nepal for the first time released a map that followed through with the more expansive claims, showing the entire area to the east of Kuthi Yankti river as part of their territory. On 13 June 2020, the bill seeking to give legal status to the new map was unanimously approved by the lower house in the Nepal Parliament.

Gallery

See also 
 Territorial disputes of India and Nepal
 Susta territory
 China–Nepal border

Notes

References

Bibliography 

 
 
 
 
 
 . IPCS preprint

Further reading 
 S. D. Pant, (2006). Nepal-India border problems.

External links 
 Kalapani–Lympiadhura territory marked on OpenStreetMap. Retrieved 8 November 2019.
 
 

Territorial disputes of Nepal
Territorial disputes of India
Borders of India
Borders of Nepal
International borders
India–Nepal relations